Ayanna Jeanene Andrews (born June 7, 1993) is an American professional softball player with the Akron Racers of National Pro Fastpitch. In 2016, she became the first woman to win a Rawlings Gold Glove Award.

Amateur career
Playing for Countryside High School in Clearwater, Florida, Andrews was named Pinellas County player of the year.  She led the state in stolen bases and batting average as a senior.

Andrews played college softball for the LSU Lady Tigers.  Twice she participated in the Women's College World Series.  She graduated from LSU in 2015.

Professional career
Andrews was selected by the Chicago Bandits of National Pro Fastpitch (NPF) in the second round of the 2015 NPF Draft.  After the 2015 season, she was traded to the Akron Racers.

In 2016, Andrews became the first woman to win a Rawlings Gold Glove Award. She was also a co-winner of the Rally Spike Award as the league's stolen base leader. In 2017, she was featured in the Body Issue of ESPN The Magazine.

References

Further reading

External links
 
 

1993 births
Living people
LSU Tigers softball players
Akron Racers players
People from Oldsmar, Florida
Sportspeople from Clearwater, Florida
Softball players from Florida
Chicago Bandits players
21st-century American women